Ramón José Velásquez Mujica (28 November 1916 – 24 June 2014) was a Venezuelan politician, historian, journalist, and lawyer. He served as the president of Venezuela between 1993 and 1994.

Background and personal life
Velásquez was born in Táchira in November 1916. His parents were Ramon Velasquez Ordoñez, a journalist and proofreader for a newspaper and educator Regina Mujica. For his initial studies he was home schooled by his parents in his hometown. He completed his primary education in San Cristóbal Simón Bolívar. In 1935 he traveled to Caracas to finish high school at the Liceo Andres Bello. Velasquez undertook his higher education at the Central University of Venezuela, from which he received a PhD in social and political sciences in 1942 and a law degree in 1943.

Writer 
Velásquez became a reporter for Últimas Noticias in 1941.
Velásquez was the president of El Nacional on two occasions (1964-1968/1979-1981).

He authored numerous books on Venezuela's political history, being generally considered in his lifetime as Venezuela's foremost historian. He was President of the National Academy of History.

Statesman 
During the dictatorship of Marcos Pérez Jiménez, Velásquez was jailed for a year for his role at the compilation of the Libro negro de la dictadura (Black book of dictatorship).  The files of this book helped expose the crimes of the dictatorial period.

In 1958, as Venezuela transitioned to democracy, Velásquez was elected to the Venezuelan Senate for the state of Tachira, and later to the Venezuelan Chamber of Deputies for the state of Miranda.

He served as Secretary General (Chief of Staff) of the Presidency during the government of Rómulo Betancourt. After that, he was part of the National Congress. During Rafael Caldera's Presidential administration, Velásquez served as Minister of Communications from 1969 until 1971. From 1984 to 1987 he was President of the Comisión para la Reforma del Estado (COPRE), the Commission on the Reform of the State. Between 1989 and 1993, he chaired the "Comisión Presidencial para Asuntos Fronterizos con Colombia", Presidential Commission for border issues with Colombia (COPAF). At the time of his death, he was a board member of the New York-based Human Rights Foundation.

President
In 1993, as a result of the crisis produced by the impeachment of President Carlos Andrés Pérez, Congress appointed Velásquez President of the Republic, finishing the constitutional period in 1994. He served from 5 June 1993 to 2 February 1994. As a highly respected national figure there was general consensus around his name for such a task. In August Velásquez held an emergency meeting to respond to the tropical storm Bret's heavy damage that leaves at least 70 dead. About 1,400 workers and volunteers helped in rescue efforts after the mudslides struck Caracas and surrounding areas, assisted by Red Cross volunteers and 800 firefighters. Storm victims were temporarily housed at the Fuerte Tiuna army base. Roads were quickly cleared of debris and mud, although many were not reopened initially due to the threat for additional mudslides. 
The government was overshadowed by the so-called  narcoindulto  to trafficker Larry Tovar Acuña, in this case the Private Secretariat of the Presidency obtained irregularly signed by the President for the release to a known drug dealer. Other events under his brief government include the bankruptcy of Banco Latino with subsequent leakage of foreign currency abroad and tragedy of Tejerías.
Among his governmental measures was the introduction of Value Added Tax as part of the Enabling Act entrusted to the National Congress.

Velásquez's cabinet (1993–1994)

Personal life and death
In 1948, Ramón José Velásquez married Ligia Betancourt Mariño (1920 – 14 July 2008) who served as First Lady of Venezuela from 1993 to 1994. On 24 June 2014 Velásquez died at the age of 97 from natural causes. He died 5 weeks after former President Jaime Lusinchi did on 21 May 2014.

Honours
 Maria Moors Cabot prize (1967)
 Member of the National Academy of History of Venezuela (1968)
 National Prize for Literature (1973), prose category, for La caída del liberalismo amarillo
 Premio Nacional de Historia of Consejo Nacional de la Cultura (CONAC), 1980
 Premio Nacional de Humanidades of CONAC, 1998
 Member of the Academia Venezolana de la Lengua, 2002
 Honorary doctorates from the University of the Andes (Venezuela), University of Carabobo, Rafael Urdaneta University (URU) and the National Experimental University of Táchira (UNET).

Books
Coro. Raíz de Venezuela (1962)
San Cristóbal. Donde la Patria empieza (1972) 
La caída del Liberalismo Amarillo. Tiempo y drama de Antonio Paredes (1972) 
Aspectos de la evolución política de Venezuela en el siglo XX (1976)
Confidencias Imaginarias de Juan Vicente Gómez (1978)
Individuos de Número (1981)
Los héroes y la Historia (1981)
Los pasos de los héroes (1988) 
Con segunda intención. Reportajes en tiempos de dictadura 1951-1955 (1990) 
Memorias de Venezuela (1990) 
Los alemanes en el Táchira (1993)
Joaquín Crespo (2005) 
Memorias del Siglo XX (2005) 
Caudillos, historiadores y pueblo (2013)

See also 

List of Venezuelans

References

External links

Biography by CIDOB Foundation 
"La Paz Ramónica" (Velasquez´s government) by Edgar C. Otálvora 
. (Velasquez's biography by Edgar C. Otálvora) 
El siglo de Ramón Jota - Lo afirmativo venezolano

Presidents of Venezuela
Venezuelan male writers
20th-century Venezuelan historians
Venezuelan journalists
20th-century Venezuelan lawyers
Members of the Senate of Venezuela
Venezuelan people of Spanish descent
Venezuelan people of Basque descent
Central University of Venezuela alumni
Academic staff of the Central University of Venezuela
People from Táchira
1916 births
2014 deaths
Government ministers of Venezuela
Democratic Action (Venezuela) politicians
Members of the Venezuelan Academy of Language
Maria Moors Cabot Prize winners
Prisoners and detainees of Venezuela
Secretariat of the Presidency ministers of Venezuela